Kamenevo is a rural locality in Vinnikovsky Selsoviet Rural Settlement, Kursky District, Kursk Oblast, Russia. Population:

Geography 
The village is located on the Vinogrobl River (a left tributary of the Tuskar in the basin of the Seym), 113 km from the Russia–Ukraine border, 15 km north-east of the district center – the town Kursk, 1.5 km from the selsoviet center – 1st Vinnikovo.

 Climate
Kamenevo has a warm-summer humid continental climate (Dfb in the Köppen climate classification).

Transport 
Kamenevo is located 11.5 km from the federal route  (Kursk – Voronezh –  "Kaspy" Highway; a part of the European route ), 4.5 km from the road of regional importance  (Kursk – Kastornoye), 4.5 km from the nearest railway halt 18 km (railway line Kursk – 146 km).

The rural locality is situated 15 km from Kursk Vostochny Airport, 131 km from Belgorod International Airport and 190 km from Voronezh Peter the Great Airport.

References

Notes

Sources

Rural localities in Kursky District, Kursk Oblast